Arnaldo Rodríguez Silva (born 11 August 1964) is a Cuban former rower. He competed in the men's coxed pair event at the 1992 Summer Olympics.

Notes

References

External links
 

1964 births
Living people
Cuban male rowers
Olympic rowers of Cuba
Rowers at the 1992 Summer Olympics
Place of birth missing (living people)
Pan American Games medalists in rowing
Pan American Games gold medalists for Cuba
Pan American Games bronze medalists for Cuba
Rowers at the 1987 Pan American Games
Rowers at the 1995 Pan American Games
Rowers at the 1999 Pan American Games
Medalists at the 1999 Pan American Games